Kibbee is the surname of:

 Guy Kibbee (1882-1956), American actor
 Lois Kibbee (1922-1993), American actress, daughter of Milton Kibbee
 Milton Kibbee (1896-1970), American actor, brother of Guy Kibbee
 Robert Kibbee (died 1982), American university administrator,  Chancellor of the City University of New York
 Roland Kibbee (1914-1984), American screenwriter and producer

See also
 Kibbie (disambiguation)
 Kibbe (surname), a list of people
 Kibbeh, a Levantine dish made of bulgar, minced onions and finely ground meat